The Jamestown Dam is a rolled-earth dam spanning the James River in Stutsman County in the U.S. state of North Dakota, serving the primary purpose of flood control. It is north of the city of Jamestown, North Dakota. It impounds the James River to form the Jamestown Reservoir. A small islet lies shortly upstream of the dam, where the James River previously split into two channels.

The shale (called Pierre Shale) has a dark gray, bedded appearance, and is mostly claystone or siltstone. The valley also contains many traces of alluvium, mainly deposited during the last ice age when the area was heavily glaciated.

Construction

Proposal and companies involved
The dam was proposed in 1951. The site selected offered the required storage with the smallest dam and with close access to embankment materials; however, the underlying rock and soil was both unstable and pervious. The problems were considered minor because the extended storage need of the reservoir only consisted of the lower  of the reservoir.

Bids for dam construction were submitted by several companies in early 1952. A bid of $1,868,862 was offered by the C.F. Lytle Company of Sioux City, Iowa. This bid was accepted, and the contract was awarded on March 25, 1952 with the notice to proceed received on March 31. The outlet works, which consist of four high-pressure floodgates, were provided by the Hardie-Tynes Manufacturing Company of Birmingham, Alabama, at a cost of $72,995. This contract was awarded on March 10, 1952, and the final shipment of the gates was made during February 1953.

Construction process
Construction began in April 1952. This wide trench served to remove as much unstable material from the foundation as possible. This material was determined to be unsuitable for construction of the dam, and eventually discarded. Placement of concrete commenced in late June. Embankment construction began in late July. The upper portion of the upstream slope of the dam was covered with a layer of riprap, and the lower section was protected by a layer of gravel. By the end of 1952, the construction work was approximately 67% complete.

Construction continued at a rapid pace after the beginning of the 1953 season. The upstream conduits for the outlet works were completed in April, and the four high pressure gates were installed beginning April 1. These and the spillway were all complete by August 31, and the main embankment was finished by September 11. On September 18, the final concrete placement occurred, and on September 20, 1953, the dam was completed under the primary contract, 251 days ahead of schedule.

Dam and reservoir

The dam embankment contains  of material, primarily dirt, rock, gravel and riprap.

The outlet works are controlled by four identical high-pressure gates, 5 feet by 6 feet (1.5 by 1.8 m) in size. Two are for normal use and two are for emergency releases.

The outlet works are designed to allow for possible future installation of hydroelectric generators and future municipal water supply.

Flood control

The Jamestown Dam's primary purpose is flood control, and has prevented approximately $36 million in flood-related damages. When it was constructed, certain deficiencies were noted in the foundations for the dam. When the reservoir is at normal levels, the failure risk is small, but as the water level rises, the potential for collapse increases. In 1993 and 1995, floods caused the lake to rise to within  of the 1969 level. An inspection by the Bureau of Reclamation's Dam Safety Department revealed that the dam could potentially fail if the deficiencies were not corrected. As a result, eight relief wells (wells that drain a pervious stratum) were installed in the dam in 1995, and a heavy gravel filter blanket to prevent erosion of embankment materials during seepage was constructed in the spring of 1996.

Recreation
It is stocked with fish by the North Dakota Game and Fish Department. Common fish species in the reservoir include pike, walleye, crappie, bluegill, smallmouth bass, muskie and bullhead.

Geology
The Bureau of Reclamation details the geology of the reservoir area:

See also
Pipestem Dam
List of dams and reservoirs in North Dakota
List of dams in the Missouri River watershed
Arrowwood National Wildlife Refuge

External links
Jamestown Dam Project (official website), U.S. Bureau of Reclamation
Jamestown Reservoir - Discover Jamestown, ND

References

Dams in North Dakota
Buildings and structures in Stutsman County, North Dakota
Earth-filled dams
Jamestown, North Dakota
United States Bureau of Reclamation dams
Dams completed in 1953